RV6 may refer to:
 Boss RV-6, a digital reverb pedal manufactured by Boss Corporation
 Mandala 6, the sixth mandala of the Rigveda
 Van's Aircraft RV-6, a kit aircraft